The following is a list of massacres that have occurred in modern Sudan (numbers may be approximate):

 10 May 2019 - ten killed in Wad Madani sit-in by Rapid Support Forces
 12 May 2019 - over 50 killed in Gedarif by NISS
 13 May 2019 - Rapid Forces killed over 100 civilians and injured hundreds in Khartoum sit-in
 13 May 2019 - 8 killed in the first General Command massacre sit-in by Rapid Support Forces

See also 

 Sudanese Revelation 
Darfur genocide

References

Sudan
Massacres

Massacres